McEuen is a surname. Notable people with the surname include:

John McEuen (born 1945), American folk musician
Paul McEuen (born 1963), American physicist
William E. McEuen (1941–2020), film producer and record producer